is a Chinese–Japanese voice actress affiliated with Aoni Production.

Biography 
Born in Beijing, she longed to become a voice actor from a young age. In high school she participated in the creation of doujin games, original drama CD, etc. and participated in voice actress/singer-related activities under the name of "kkryu".

In 2006, she became a student of Beijing Foreign Studies University's Japanese language institute and in 2008 graduated from the university. During her time at BFSU, she was an exchange student in Japan, studying at Aichi Bunkyo University for ten months.

After graduation she studied again at the Nippon Engineering College (NEEC) for two years. While studying, she appeared as a 7th grader in the show Dream · Dream · Party.

In an interview in 2016, Ryu said that she was influenced by the success of Romi Park in the seiyu scene and realized that voice actors of non-Japanese heritage could have a successful career.

Filmography

Television animation
 2012
 Kingdom as Gong's mother (ep 24)
 Code:Breaker as Boy With Superpowers
 Blast of Tempest as TV Announcer

 2014
 Dragon Collection as Tarte
 Medamayaki no Kimi Itsu Tsubusu? as Chinatsu
 Pretty Guardian Sailor Moon Crystal as Shingo Tsukino

2016
Idol Memories as Minato Yasukawa
Soul Buster as Lingyun (Ryō Un)

2017
KADO - The Right Answer as Airport announcer (ep 1)

2018
Waka Okami wa Shōgakusei! as Rin Karin
To Be Heroine as Tōichi Tōin

Theatrical animation
 2011
 Kuiba as Manji and Yuan
 The Tibetan Dog as Tianjin

 2014
 Expelled from Paradise as Administration Public Relations

OVA 
 2013
 Vassalord as Child
 Voice provider of VOCALOID YANHE

 2014
 Pretty Guardian Sailor Moon Crystal OVA as Shingo Tsukino

Video games
 2014
 Magica Wars Zanbatsu

 2015
 Digimon Story: Cyber Sleuth as Fei Wong Tomoe Ignacio

 2016
 The King of Fighters XIV as Meitenkun
 Grobda Remix as Shitsuki Reihara

 2017
 Digimon Story: Cyber Sleuth - Hacker's Memory as Fei Wong Tomoe Ignacio

 2018
 Food Fantasy (2018) as Sashimi, Sandwich

2019
Samurai Shodown (2019) as Wu-Ruixiang

2022
The King of Fighters XV as Meitenkun

Other
 VOCALOID3 sound library YANHE sound source

References

External links 
 
 

1985 births
Living people
Actresses from Beijing
Aoni Production voice actors
Chinese expatriates in Japan
Chinese voice actresses
Japanese video game actresses
Japanese voice actresses
Manga artists
21st-century Chinese actresses
21st-century Japanese actresses